A. L. Narasimhan (born 27 April 1940) is a former Indian cricket umpire. He stood in one Test match, India vs. Sri Lanka, in 1994 and four ODI games between 1983 and 1993.

See also
 List of Test cricket umpires
 List of One Day International cricket umpires

References

1940 births
Living people
Place of birth missing (living people)
Indian Test cricket umpires
Indian One Day International cricket umpires